Tales is an album by the American musician Marcus Miller, released in 1995. He supported it with a North American tour.

The album peaked at No. 7 on Billboard'''s Contemporary Jazz Albums chart. It was nominated for a Grammy Award, in the "Best Contemporary Jazz Performance" category.

 Production 
The album was produced by Miller. It samples the voices of several Black American musicians. "Eric" is dedicated to the guitarist Eric Gale. Miller wrote or cowrote nine of the album's songs; the title track was written with Allen Toussaint.

Critical receptionThe Independent wrote that the album "lashes its constituent parts together with stupendous playing and rigorous adherence to the principle that music is about spinning yarns, not showing off." The Guardian determined that most of Miller's music "occupies a safe centre ground of funk basslines, loose-limbed drumming from Poogie Bell, and layers of beatific keyboard harmonies."

The Rocky Mountain News opined that Meshell Ndegeocello "spellbinds with 'Rush Over', a ballad wrought from spoken word and singing." The Oregonian praised Miller's "knack for welding groove to harmonic structure and balancing upscale polish with urban grit." The Atlanta Journal-Constitution'' deemed Miller "a fusionaire whose slickness is cued to the marketplace, but he also knows how to round up a band."

AllMusic wrote that some songs "ramble on a bit and one wishes that Marcus Miller would drop the funk now and then for variety's sake, but in general his set holds one's interest."

Track listing
All tracks composed by Marcus Miller except where noted.
 "The Blues" – 	5:35
 "Tales (Intro)" (Miller, Allen Toussaint) – 	0:12
 "Tales" (Miller, Allen Toussaint) – 	5:42
 "Eric" – 	6:16
 "True Geminis" – 	5:36
 "Rush Over" – 	4:57
 "Running Through My Dreams (Interlude)" – 	1:27
 "Ethiopia" – 	5:15
 "Strange Fruit (Intro)" (Abel Meeropol) – 	1:46
 "Strange Fruit" (Abel Meeropol) – 	2:02
 "Visions" (Stevie Wonder) – 	5:37
 "Tales (Reprise)" – 	2:34
 "Forevermore (Intro)" – 	0:32
 "Forevermore" – 	4:59
 "Infatuation" – 	5:08
 "Come Together" (John Lennon, Paul McCartney) – 	5:30

Personnel
Poogie Bell  – Drums
Dean Brown  – Guitar
Hiram Bullock  – Guitar
Kenny Garrett  – Alto Saxophone
Lalah Hathaway  – Vocals
Jason Miles  – Programming
Marcus Miller  – Organ, Synthesizer, Flute, Guitar, Piano, Clarinet (Bass), Bass, Rhythm guitar, Keyboards, Programming, Producer, Engineer, Sampling
Meshell Ndegeocello  – Synthesizer, Vocals
Q-Tip  – Speech/Speaker/Speaking Part
Joshua Redman  – Tenor Saxophone
Michael "Patches" Stewart  – Trumpet
Dave Ward  – Programming
Lenny White  – Drums
Bernard Wright  – Organ, Synthesizer, Clavinet, Synthesizer Bass

Production

Roland Alvarez  – Engineer
Ray Bardani  – Engineer
Goh Hotoda  – Engineer
Bruce Miller  – Engineer
Jonathan Miller  – Engineer
David Ward II  – Engineer

References

Marcus Miller albums
1995 albums
Albums produced by Marcus Miller
Jazz fusion albums by American artists